Esher railway station is a station on the South West Main Line operated by South Western Railway in Surrey, England. The station adjoins the north of Esher with two footpaths skirting Sandown Park Racecourse, the town's commercial area being 300 metres beyond the racecourse entrance.

History
The railway arrived here in 1838. A minor request stop was immediately opened and a station built and named Ditton Marsh, being the wetter part of Ditton Common. The common marks the boundary between what was then the west of Thames Ditton and Esher. The station was opened on 21 May 1838, and the name changed to Esher and Hampton Court about 1840. It has since been renamed twice more: to Esher and Claremont in July 1844, and to Esher on 1 June 1913. It has also been shown as Esher for Claremont, or as Esher for Sandown Park in some timetables.

Amenities
The station and track is elevated above street level

A special gate on the platform opens directly onto Sandown Park racecourse.

Services
At off-peak times two trains per hour in both directions call at Esher, the termini being London Waterloo station and the larger Surrey town of Woking.

Additional trains operate during peak hours, of which at least 4 (2 in the morning rush-hour, 2 in the evening) terminate at Guildford (which also serves as the terminus for stopping trains on Sundays).

Woking is the point of change for services to longer distance destinations to the south-west (see stations below).

Former amenities
Two additional island platforms are disused and not accessible to passengers though passed by through trains.

Bus services 515 and on Sundays 715 serve the station.

Location
The station is to the west of Weston Green which falls within the Esher postal district. Esher parish is close by the station and has included the Sandown Park grounds since its establishment in the early medieval period. A footpath to the west of the station skirts Sandown Park Racecourse and leads to the Lower Green area of Esher. The town's commercial area lies 300 metres beyond the racecourse entrance, followed by West End and Claremont. The station is the closest to Esher by road. Thames Ditton railway station on the branch line to Hampton Court is closest to the eastern half of Weston Green, which lies within the Thames Ditton postal district.

In film, television, fiction and the media
Esher railway station featured on an episode of the children's TV series Little Howard's Big Question, in which the Dutch graphic and mathematical artist M. C. Escher was confused with Esher and one of his drawings mistakenly thought to be the railway station.

See also

 Esher
 Weston Green
Molesey

Notes and references
Notes 

References

External links

Railway stations in Surrey
Former London and South Western Railway stations
Railway stations in Great Britain opened in 1838
Railway stations served by South Western Railway
Borough of Elmbridge